Deuterodiscoelius is an Australian genus of potter wasps. It contains the following species:

 Deuterodiscoelius australensis (Perkins, 1914)
 Deuterodiscoelius confuses Giordani Soika, 1969
 Deuterodiscoelius ephippium (Saussure, 1855)
 Deuterodiscoelius insignis (Saussure, 1856) 
 Deuterodiscoelius pseudospinosus Giordani Soika, 1969 
 Deuterodiscoelius spinosus (Saussure, 1856)
 Deuterodiscoelius verreauxii (Saussure, 1852)

References

Biological pest control wasps
Potter wasps
Taxa named by Karl Wilhelm von Dalla Torre